Elevate is the second studio album by American boy band Big Time Rush. It was released on November 21, 2011, by Columbia Records in association with Nickelodeon. The band worked with accomplished songwriters and producers for the album. These include those that assisted with the material from their debut album, such as Emanuel Kiriakou, Lindy Robbins, Nicholas Furlong, Damon Sharpe, Eric Sanicola and Lucas Secon, along with other notable songwriters and producers, such as JR Rotem, Christopher Stewart, The-Dream, Jay Sean, and Ryan Tedder. The production process of the album took place between nine months to a year, most of which was during their touring process.

Background
The album acts as the soundtrack to the Nickelodeon television series Big Time Rush, which features songs that appeared in the series' second season and the television movie, Big Time Movie. Following the success of their first release, the band was inspired to be more involved in the writing process for this album, writing together or separately a total of eight songs. Elevate is mainly a pop-inspired dance-rock album, also showcasing soul-pop and alternative rock. The first single from Elevate, "Music Sounds Better with U", was released on November 1, 2011.

Promotion
TeenNick hosted a listening party in support of the band's new album, premiering every song on the album along with playing episodes that contain songs from the album and playing the music video for the first single, "Music Sounds Better with U". Nickelodeon hosted a thirty-minute special called Big Time Rush: Music Sounds Better With U in which scenes from the band's tour and studio recording sessions are compiled together for airing. The scenes feature information about the recording and production of the album.

Singles
"Music Sounds Better With U", featuring Mann, was released as first single on November 1, 2011. The music video was released November 12, 2011 during their brand new special, Big Time Rush: Music Sounds Better With U. The second and last single was "Windows Down", released on June 25, 2012, from the re-released version.

Promotional singles
"If I Ruled the World", featuring Iyaz, was released on July 22, 2011. The music video was released July 23, 2011 and features the guys traveling and performing for their fans. It was predicted as a Future Hit by This Must Be Pop Awards. "Elevate" was released on June 1, 2012, as the second promotional single on Apple Music in the United Kingdom, containing "Blow Your Speakers" as the B-side.

Better With U Tour
A tour for the album was announced in early fall 2011, named Better with U Tour, taken from the album's first single. The tour began on February 17, 2012, in Las Vegas, Nevada and ended at Radio City Music Hall in New York City on March 9, 2012. JoJo and One Direction were the opening acts for the tour. While visiting the United Kingdom in 2012, the band revealed 4 alternate covers for the album exclusive to the country, each one featuring individual pictures of each of the members and an autograph. These Special Editions were released at the same time the regular UK edition did (February 6) and share the same track list. These special covers are presented in slipcase package.

Critical reception

The album received mixed to positive reviews with music critics and fans, mostly praising the production and more mature sound. Matt Collar of AllMusic stated, "the album brings to mind a mix of Maroon 5's funky soul-pop and the yearning alt-rock of OneRepublic. This is slick, well-produced pop music that, while aimed at 'tween' fans of the band's Nickelodeon TV show, has enough smart songcraft and romantic passion to appeal to even more mature fans of radio-friendly pop music." He praised songs such as "Music Sounds Better With U", "No Idea" and "Time of Our Life" calling them, "positive-minded and joyful party tracks." Jessica Dawson of Common Sense Media said, "The songs are crisper and  more contemporary, letting them show off their boy-band harmonies with beats that are catchy but perhaps a bit too synthesized."

Commercial performance

The album debuted at number one on the iTunes album chart as well as a number 12 debut on the Billboard 200 and stayed 22 weeks on chart. In its first week, the album sold 70,000 copies. As of 2012, the album has sold 208,000 copies in the United States. The album received a Gold plaque by the Recording Industry Association of America (RIAA) for 500,000 units sales.

Track listing

Charts

Weekly charts

Year-end charts

Certifications

Release history

References

2011 albums
Columbia Records albums
Albums produced by Cutfather
Albums produced by J. R. Rotem
Albums produced by Ryan Tedder
Big Time Rush albums